Honnemaradu is a tourist place situated on the back waters of River Sharavathi in India. Honnemardu derived its name from the Honne tree. However, the literal meaning of Honnemardu is Golden Lake. This is perhaps a reference to the fact that Honnemardu is located on the backwaters of the Sharavathi river.

It is in Sagara taluk, Karnataka about 35 km  from Sagara on the way to Jog Falls, 12 km from Talaguppa and 392 km  from Bangalore.

Attractions

Honnemaradu is a small village located on the hills that overlook the Linganamakki Reservoir. The reservoir is also known as Honnemaradu after the village. In the middle of this water body there is a small island that attracts campers. In addition to the adventure activities, Honnemaradu is popular with birdwatchers, who can spend hours watching and identifying the variety of birds and butterflies. Honnemaradu camp is managed by a team of nature enthusiasts called 'Adventurers'.

Honnemaradu is tucked away in the lush greenery of the Western Ghats along the Sharavati backwaters near Sagara. Encompassing an area of 50 km by 80 km, the reservoir at Honnemaradu (or "Golden Lake") is known for its views of the sunrise and sunset.

Trekking is only permitted along roads in a designated area.

Some of the water sports activities here include boating and kayaking, but it is only permitted with a guide. Swimming is not allowed. There is no longer equipment for wind rafting.

 Jog Falls is created by the Sharavathi River. The water plummets down from a great height of 289 ft, the highest in India. It is located in Sagara Taluk.
 Dabbe Falls, Sagara is located 30 km from Jog Falls, Dabbe is another waterfall in Sagara. This waterfall is in the mountains near Hosagadde.
 Kayakers can plan their next vacation in the hill stations of Karnataka. Kayaking in Honnemaradu is permitted only with a guide.

Transport

Road
 Bangalore-Shimoga-Sagar-Talaguppa-Honnemaradu
 Bellary-Hospet-Harihar-Shimoga-Sagar-Talaguppa-Honnemaradu

Railway station
 Nearby Railway station are: Shimoga - Talaguppa - Sagar
 Train Route 1: Mysore - Bangalore - Shimoga - Sagar - Talaguppa

References

Reservoirs in Karnataka
Villages in Shimoga district
Geography of Shimoga district